Thomas Ehrlich (born March 4, 1934) is a consulting professor at the Stanford Graduate School of Education. He has been married to Ellen R. Ehrlich since 1957. They have three children David, Elizabeth, and Paul, and nine grandchildren. They live in Palo Alto California.

From 2000 to 2010 he was a Senior Scholar at the Carnegie Foundation for the Advancement of Teaching. He has previously served as president of Indiana University, provost of the University of Pennsylvania, and Dean of Stanford Law School. He was also the first president of the Legal Services Corporation in Washington, DC, and the first director of the International Development Cooperation Agency, reporting to President Carter. After his tenure at Indiana University, he was a Distinguished University Scholar at California State University and taught regularly at San Francisco State University. He is author, co-author, or editor of 14 books. He has been a trustee of Bennett College, Mills College, and the University of Pennsylvania. He is a graduate of Harvard College and Harvard Law School and holds five honorary degrees. He is a member of the American Academy of Arts and Sciences.

Early life and education 
Ehrlich was born on March 4, 1934, in Cambridge, Massachusetts and went to Phillips Exeter Academy for high school. He graduated magna cum laude from Harvard College in 1956 and magna cum laude from Harvard Law School in 1959.  While at Harvard, he was elected to Phi Beta Kappa and served as Article Editor for the Harvard Law Review. He was law clerk to Judge Learned Hand of the U.S. Court of Appeals for the Second Circuit.

He holds five honorary degrees.

President of Indiana University 

Ehrlich became the fifteenth president of Indiana University on August 1, 1987, and retired from the position on July 31, 1994. While at IU, Ehrlich served as chair of the Midwest Universities Consortium for International Activities.  During his time at IU, Ehrlich helped to increased overall retention rates, especially among minority students. The student population also grew, with 96,000 students attending one of the eight IU campuses as of 1994. Ehrlich was known for wearing a bowtie (usually red).

In 2000, Indiana University established the local Thomas Ehrlich Service Learning Award and the national Thomas Ehrlich Civically Engaged Faculty Award, an annual award given to faculty members who display outstanding achievements in the field of community service. IU President Myles Brand said that, "Tom Ehrlich's leadership raised the level of visibility and enhanced the success of service learning programs on all our campuses. This award will honor his legacy and recognize faculty who continue to show leadership in this area.

Ehrlich was succeed as IU president by Myles Brand, who served from 1994 to 2000.

Publications 

Ehrlich has served as author, co-author, or editor of fourteen books during his academic career.
The Courage to Inquire: Ideals and Realities in Higher Education (1995) with Juliet Frey
Reconnecting Education and Foundations: Turning Good Intentions into Educational Capital (2007) with Ray Bacchetti
Educating for Democracy: Preparing Undergraduates for Lives of Responsible Political Engagement (2007) with Anne Colby, Elizabeth Beaumont and Josh Corngold
Rethinking Undergraduate Business Education: Liberal Learning for the Profession (2011) with Anne Colby, William Sullivan and Jonathan Dolle
Civic Work, Civic Lessons: Two Generations Reflect on Public Service (2013) with Ernestine Fu

References

External links 
University Honors and Awards
Stanford Faculty Page
Presidents of Indiana University
Thomas Ehrlich: An Oral History, Faculty Senate Oral History Project, Stanford Historical Society Oral History Program, 2016
Thomas Ehrlich: An Oral History, Stanford Historical Society Oral History Program, 2018

Presidents of Indiana University
Living people
Indiana University faculty
University of Pennsylvania faculty
Harvard Law School alumni
Stanford Graduate School of Education faculty
Stanford Law School faculty
1934 births
Law clerks of Judge Learned Hand
Phillips Exeter Academy alumni
Deans of Stanford Law School